Tikhomirov (female Tikhomirova (Тихомирова)) is a Russian surname, which may refer to:

 Aleksandr Tikhomirov - zoologist
 Alexander Tikhomirov - a Soviet army officer and Hero of the Soviet Union
 Dmitriy Tikhomirov - pedagogue
 Igor Tikhomirov - Soviet and Canadian fencer
 Igor Tikhomirov (musician) - Soviet and Russian jazz guitarist, member of the band Kino
 Ioasaf Tikhomirov (1872-1908) - a Russian actor and founder member of the Moscow Art Theatre
 Lev Tikhomirov - Russian revolutionary
 Mikhail Tikhomirov - Soviet paleographer
 Nikolai Tikhomirov - Russian engineer
 Nikolai Tikhomirov (chemical engineer) - Russian Soviet chemical engineer and rocket pioneer
 Vasily Tikhomirov - Russian and Soviet dancer and choreographer
 Viktor Tikhomirov - a Soviet scientist
 Vladimir Tikhomirov - a Soviet army officer and Hero of the Soviet Union  
 Vladimir Tikhomirov - Soviet geologist
 Metropolitan Sergius (Tikhomirov) of Japan

Russian-language surnames

ru:Тихомиров